Zolotinka Urban Settlement is a municipal formation (an urban settlement) in Neryungrinsky Municipal District of the Sakha Republic, Russia, one of the six urban settlements in the district. Its territory comprises the territories of two administrative divisions of Neryungrinsky District—the Settlement of Zolotinka and the Settlement of Nagorny.

References

Notes

Sources

Urban settlements of Russia
Geography of the Sakha Republic